Tolimkhan-e Olya (also Romanized as Tolīmkhān-e ‘Olyā; also known as Towlīm Khān-e Bālā) is a village in Chaybasar-e Jonubi Rural District, in the Central District of Maku County, West Azerbaijan Province, Iran. At the 2006 census, its population was 58, in 12 families.

References 

Populated places in Maku County